Scott Eaton or Scot Eaton may refer to:

Scot Eaton, comic book artist, best known for his work on Friendly Neighborhood Spider-Man, X-Men: Endangered Species, and X-Men: Messiah Complex
Scott Eaton (American football) (born 1944), former American football defensive back in the National Football League
Scott Eaton (artist) (born 1973, Washington), American artist, designer and photographer

See also
Scott Elarton, retired right-handed pitcher